Letwin is a surname with Yiddish origins. It may refer to:

Gordon Letwin (born 1952), American software developer 
Michael Letwin (born 1956), American public defense lawyer
Oliver Letwin (born 1956), British politician
Shirley Robin Letwin (1924–1993), American academic
William Letwin (1922–2013), American academic

Yiddish-language surnames